Carbohydrate sulfotransferase 12 is an enzyme that in humans is encoded by the CHST12 gene.

References

External links

Further reading